Shaun George (born 25 January 1968) is a South African former cricketer who later became an umpire. He is part of Cricket South Africa's umpire panel for first-class matches.

Playing career
George played first-class cricket for Eastern Province and Transvaal between 1987 and 1991.

Umpiring career
After making his first-class and List A umpiring debuts in 2004, George made his international debut in a Twenty20 international (T20I) in 2010. He made his One-day international (ODI) debut the following year.

In January 2018, he was named as one of the seventeen on-field umpires for the 2018 Under-19 Cricket World Cup. He was later appointed as one of the on-field umpires for the tournament final. In May 2018, he was promoted to the ICC Test/ODI Emerging Panel of umpires.

In October 2018, he was named as one of the twelve on-field umpires for the 2018 ICC Women's World Twenty20. Along with Langton Rusere, he was appointed as one of the on-field umpires for the tournament's final.

In July 2019, George umpired in his 50th ODI, in the third ODI between Ireland and Zimbabwe, at Stormont, Belfast. In February 2020, the ICC named him as one of the umpires to officiate in matches during the 2020 ICC Women's T20 World Cup in Australia.

See also
 List of One Day International cricket umpires
 List of Twenty20 International cricket umpires

References

1968 births
Living people
South African cricketers
South African One Day International cricket umpires
South African Twenty20 International cricket umpires
People from Port Elizabeth